The Armada de Barlovento (Windward Fleet) was a military formation that consisted of 50 ships created by the Spanish Empire to protect its overseas American territories from attacks from its European enemies, as well as attacks from pirates and privateers.

History

In 1635, the Spanish crown decided to consolidate its naval power and safeguard its ocean trade between Spain and the Spanish territories overseas. This was done in order to counter the English and French corsairs who preyed on the Spanish treasure fleet. They proposed to create a series of strategic bases between the Bahamas and the Antilles and the creation of an associated armada. Towards this purposes, they ordered the creation of new warships. By the end of the century they had built several small flotillas.

Already in the 17th century, prior to the increase in piracy in the Caribbean, Spain had formed a large armada, at considerable economic cost, paid for in part by new taxes in the Indies. The armada was important to Spanish politics in America, playing a crucial defensive and logistical role. In particular it protected the trade and the coasts of the Spanish territories in America, even as they began to coveted by other European powers.

The Armada de Barlovento was dissolved in 1748.

References

Pirates of the Americas, Volume 1 by David F. Marley (ABC-CLIO, 2010)
The Buccaneer's Realm: Pirate Life on the Spanish Main, 1674-1688 by Benerson Little (Potomac Books, 2007)

Spanish Empire